SCHC may refer to:

 Stichtsche Cricket en Hockey Club, a Dutch multisportclub mainly known for its field hockey
 Static Context Header Compression, an Internet protocol